Eton Place Dalian is a 4-building skyscraper complex in Dalian, China. The tallest tower is 388 m high and has 81 floors. It was completed in 2016.

See also
 List of tallest buildings in the world
 List of tallest buildings in China
 List of tallest buildings in Dalian

References

Buildings and structures under construction in China
Skyscrapers in Dalian
Skyscraper office buildings in China